Band Aid may refer to:

 Band Aid (band), a British musical ensemble raising money for famine relief in Ethiopia during the 1980s
 Follow-up musical ensembles:
 Band Aid II (1989)
 Band Aid 20 (2004)
 Band Aid 30 (2014)
 Band Aid (Italian band), a band active in Italy in early 1980s
 "Band Aid", a song on Pixie Lott's album Turn It Up
 Band-Aid, a brand of adhesive bandage
 Adhesive bandage, a genericised trademark
 Band Aid (film)

See also
Bandage
Live Aid